Hugo-Hilaire Thomas Henry Mbongue Mbongue (born July 27, 2004) is a Canadian soccer player who plays for Toronto FC in Major League Soccer.

Early life
Mbongue began playing soccer for the Cherry Beach Recreation Centre when he was three. When he was four, he began playing with Clairlea-Westview SC. Afterwards, he joined the North Toronto Nitros, before later moving on to the Toronto FC Academy.

Career
He joined Toronto FC II of USL League One for the 2021 season. He made his debut for Toronto FC II on May 22, 2021 against North Texas SC. He joined Toronto FC III during the summer for the 2021 League1 Ontario Summer Championship season. He attended the first team's pre-season in 2022, scoring the tying goal in the 89th minute in an exhibition match against Sporting Kansas City. He scored his first official professional goal on April 10, scoring twice against New York City FC II in MLS Next Pro. He signed his first professional contract with Toronto FC II on May 27 (he had been playing on an academy contract prior to this).

In September 2022, he signed a Homegrown Player contract with the first team, Toronto FC in Major League Soccer, through the year 2025, with an team option for 2026. On October 9, he made his first team debut, as a substitute, in the final game of the 2022 against the Philadelphia Union.

International career
Mbongue was named to the Canadian U15 squad for the 2019 CONCACAF Boys' Under-15 Championship. In their opening match, he scored a hat trick in a 7-0 victory over El Salvador U15. In June 2022, he was named to the Canadian U-20 team for the 2022 CONCACAF U-20 Championship.

Personal
Mbongue is of Cameroonian descent through his mother. He is the younger brother of Colorado Rapids player Ralph Priso.

Career statistics

References

2004 births
Living people
Canadian soccer players
Canada men's youth international soccer players
Canadian people of Cameroonian descent
Black Canadian soccer players
Association football midfielders
Soccer players from Toronto
Toronto FC players
Toronto FC II players
North Toronto Nitros players
MLS Next Pro players
USL League One players